El Paraíso is a town, with a population of 26,640 (2020 calculation), and a municipality in the Honduran department of El Paraíso.

The town is the site of a cigar factory operated by Nestor Plasencia, in which cigars are made under a variety of labels, including that of Rocky Patel.

References 

Municipalities of the El Paraíso Department